Gongliao is a railway station on the Taiwan Railways Administration Yilan line. It is located in Gongliao District, New Taipei, Taiwan.

History
The station was opened on 30 November 1924.

See also
 List of railway stations in Taiwan

References

1924 establishments in Taiwan
Railway stations in New Taipei
Railway stations opened in 1924
Railway stations served by Taiwan Railways Administration